Nash County is a county located in the U.S. state of North Carolina. As of the 2020 census, the population was 94,970. Its county seat is Nashville.

Nash County is now a part of the Rocky Mount, NC Metropolitan Statistical Area, instead of the Raleigh, NC Metropolitan Statistical Area.

History
Nash County was formed in 1777 from Edgecombe County. It was named for American Revolutionary War Brigadier General Francis Nash, who was mortally wounded at the Battle of Germantown that year.

In 1855, parts of Nash, Edgecombe, Johnston, and Wayne Counties were combined to form Wilson County.

Geography

State and local protected areas 
 Flower Hill Nature Preserve (part)
 Sandy Creek Public Game Land

Major water bodies 
 Fishing Creek
 Moccasin Creek
 Pig Basket Creek
 Sapony Creek
 Stony Creek
 Swift Creek
 Tar River
 Tar River Reservoir
 Toisnot Swamp
 Turkey Creek

Adjacent counties
 Franklin County - west
 Johnston County - southwest
 Wake County - southwest
 Wilson County - south
 Edgecombe County - east
 Halifax County - northeast
 Warren County - north

Major highways

  (Concurrency with US 64)
 
 
 
 
  (Nashville)
  (Rocky Mount)

Major infrastructure 
 CSX Intermodal Terminal, Shared between Edgecombe County
 Rocky Mount-Wilson Regional Airport

Demographics

2020 census

As of the 2020 United States census, there were 94,970 people, 37,574 households, and 27,002 families residing in the county.

2000 census
As of the census of 2000, 87,420 people, 33,644 households, and 23,920 families resided in the county. The population density was 162 people per square mile (62/km2). The 37,051 housing units averaged 69 per square mile (26/km2). The racial makeup of the county was 61.94% White, 33.93% Black or African American, 0.45% Native American, 0.57% Asian, 0.02% Pacific Islander, 2.06% from other races, and 1.02% from two or more races. About 3.36% of the population was Hispanic or Latino of any race.

Of the 33,644 households, 32.70% had children under the age of 18 living with them, 52.70% were married couples living together, 14.50% had a female householder with no husband present, and 28.90% were not families. About 25% of all households were made up of individuals, and 9.60% had someone living alone who was 65 years of age or older. The average household size was 2.54 and the average family size was 3.02.

In the county, the population was distributed as 25.40% under the age of 18, 8.50% from 18 to 24, 30.10% from 25 to 44, 23.50% from 45 to 64, and 12.40% who were 65 years of age or older. The median age was 36 years. For every 100 females, there were 92.70 males. For every 100 females age 18 and over, there were 89.10 males.

The median income for a household in the county was $37,147, and for a family was $44,769. Males had a median income of $32,459 versus $24,438 for females. The per capita income for the county was $18,863. About 10.30% of families and 13.40% of the population were below the poverty line, including 17.80% of those under age 18 and 15.20% of those age 65 or over.

Government and politics
Nash County was originally a typically overwhelmingly Democratic "Solid South" county with a large and completely disfranchised black population. Although it gave a plurality to Populist candidate James B. Weaver in 1892, unlike Sampson County or Alabama's Chilton County it did not subsequently turn to the Republican Party. Nash County would vote Democratic in every election from 1896 to 1964 – in Franklin D. Roosevelt and Harry S. Truman's five elections the Republicans never received eleven percent of the county's limited electorate's ballots – before supporting George Wallace's American Independent candidacy in 1968, and voting Republican for the first time in 1972. After turning like most Wallace counties to Southern Democrat Jimmy Carter in 1976, Nash would  later swing Republican from 1980 to 2004 before turning into one of the nation's most closely contested counties in the past four elections, with the margin of victory being less than 1,000 votes in every election since.

Nash County is a member of the regional Upper Coastal Plain Council of Governments.

Sheriff
The Sheriff's Office provides police services for the unincorporated areas of the county.

Communities

Cities
 Rocky Mount (largest city, parts located in Edgecombe County)

Towns
 Bailey
 Castalia
 Dortches
 Middlesex
 Momeyer
 Nashville (county seat)
 Red Oak
 Spring Hope
 Sharpsburg (part)
 Whitakers (part)
 Zebulon (part)

Census-designated place
 Corinth

Townships

 Bailey
 Battleboro
 Castalia
 Coopers
 Dry Wells
 Ferrells
 Griffins
 Jackson
 Mannings
 Nashville
 North Whitakers
 Oak Level
 Red Oak
 Rocky Mount
 Spring Hope
 South Whitakers
 Stony Creek

See also
 List of counties in North Carolina
 National Register of Historic Places listings in Nash County, North Carolina
 List of future Interstate Highways
 Nash Community College, located near Nashville
 Haliwa-Saponi, state-recognized tribe that resides in the county

References

External links

 
 
 NCGenWeb Nash County - free genealogy resources for the county

 
Rocky Mount metropolitan area
1777 establishments in North Carolina
Populated places established in 1777
Majority-minority counties in North Carolina